Fernando Augusto de Castro Ribeiro (born 30 March 1997), better known as Fernando Castro or just Fernando, is a Brazilian footballer who plays as a goalkeeper.

Club career
Born in Orlândia, São Paulo, Fernando Castro joined Santos' youth setup in 2010, from Botafogo-SP. On 1 March 2016, he renewed his contract with the club until the end of 2018.

On 19 April 2018, Fernando Castro signed a two-year contract with fellow Série A club Bahia, after terminating his contract with Peixe. He made his professional debut on 2 September, coming on as a half-time substitute for injured Douglas Friedrich in a 2–0 away defeat to Atlético Paranaense.

On 13 June 2020, after being mainly a third-choice, Fernando Castro moved abroad and joined Liga Portugal 2 side Arouca on a three-year contract.

Personal life
Fernando Castro's mother Solange was a professional basketball player, and appeared in the 1983 Pan American Games. She died in 2017 due to a lymphoma.

Career statistics

Honours
Bahia
Campeonato Baiano: 2018, 2019, 2020

References

External links

1997 births
Living people
People from Orlândia
Brazilian footballers
Association football goalkeepers
Campeonato Brasileiro Série A players
Esporte Clube Bahia players
Liga Portugal 2 players
F.C. Arouca players
Brazilian expatriate footballers
Brazilian expatriate sportspeople in Portugal
Expatriate footballers in Portugal
Footballers from São Paulo (state)